The Best Little Whorehouse Goes Public is a musical with a book by Larry L. King and Peter Masterson and music and lyrics by Carol Hall. It is a sequel to the 1978 musical The Best Little Whorehouse in Texas.

Plot
Hoping to recover $26 million in back taxes owed them by Las Vegas whorehouse Stallion Fields, the IRS lures former brothel madam Mona Stangley out of retirement to run the operation. Complications arise when billionaire Sam Dallas arranges the sale of shares in the enterprise on the stock exchange and right-wing politician Senator A. Harry Hardast objects to his plan.

The Vegas locale allows for an ongoing parade of barely dressed showgirls in glitzy Bob Mackie costumes, Sonny and Cher, Elvis Presley, Liberace, and Siegfried and Roy impersonators, and a two-bit stand-up comic acting as emcee against a background of flashing neon lights and accompanied by the sound of ever-jangling slot machines.

Reception
After 28 previews, the Broadway production, directed by Tommy Tune and Peter Masterson and choreographed by Tune and Jeff Calhoun, opened on May 10, 1994 at the Lunt-Fontanne Theatre, where it ran for 16 performances. The cast included Dee Hoty as Mona, Scott Holmes as Sam, Ronn Carroll as the Senator, and Jim David as the emcee.

An original cast recording was released by Varèse Sarabande.

Musical numbers

Act I
Let the Devil Take Us
Nothin' Like a Picture Show
I'm Leavin' Texas
It's Been a While
Brand New Start

Act II
Down and Dirty
Call Me
Change In Me
Here for the Hearing
Piece of the Pie
Change In Me (Reprise)
If We Open Our Eyes

Nominations
Tony Award for Best Actress in a Musical (Dee Hoty)
Drama Desk Award for Outstanding Orchestrations
Drama Desk Award for Outstanding Costume Design

References

External links
Internet Broadway Database listing

1994 musicals
Broadway musicals
Plays set in Nevada
Sequel plays